ABQ is the Australian Broadcasting Corporation's Brisbane TV station.

ABQ may also refer to:

Places
 Albuquerque, New Mexico, United States
 Albuquerque International Sunport (IATA airport code ABQ; ICAO airport code: KABQ), Albuquerque, NM, USA
 Kirtland Air Force Base (IATA airport code ABQ; ICAO airport code: KABQ), Albuquerque, NM, USA
 Alvarado Transportation Center (Amtrak station code ABQ), Albuquerque, NM, USA

Entertainment
 "ABQ" (Breaking Bad), an episode of the television show Breaking Bad
 Alban Berg Quartet, a string quartet founded in Vienna, Austria
 Annapolis Brass Quintet, a brass quintet founded in 1979

Other uses
 Abaza language (ISO 639 language code: abq), a Northwest Caucasian language spoken in Russia and Turkey
 Airblue (IATA airline code: PA; ICAO airline code: ABQ), a Pakistani airline
 Associação Brasileira de Química, the publisher of the chemistry scientific journal Anais da Associação Brasileira de Química

See also

 
 ABO (disambiguation)
 AB (disambiguation)
 BQ (disambiguation)